Helena National Forest is located in west-central Montana, in the United States. Covering , the forest is broken into several separate sections. The eastern regions are dominated by the Big Belt Mountains, and are the location of the Gates of the Mountains Wilderness, which remains much as it did when the Lewis and Clark Expedition passed through the region. The western sections have both the continental divide and the Scapegoat Wilderness area, which is part of the Bob Marshall Wilderness complex. The southern region includes the Elkhorn Mountains. The forest is composed of a mixture of grass and sagebrush covered lowlands with "island" pockets of lodgepole pine and more mountainous areas where Douglas fir, spruce and larch can be found. The rocky mountains in the region do not exceed 10,000 feet (3,000 m). 

The grizzly bear has a sustained population in the northwestern section of the forest, especially in the Scapegoat Wilderness. Other predators such as wolves, bobcats, wolverines, mountain lions, and Canadian lynx are also present Black bears are numerous as are elk, moose, mule deer, and antelope. There are also small populations of bighorn sheep and mountain goats. Along streams and lakes, sightings of nesting bald eagles and other raptors are becoming more common due to protection of these species and their vitally important waterways.

700 miles (1100 km) of hiking trails are located in the forest along with numerous trout streams and several lakes. There are over a dozen improved campgrounds. Snowmobile use is common in the winter months as is cross-country skiing.

Interstate 15 runs north–south and U.S. Route 12 runs east–west through the area.
The largest nearby city is Helena, Montana, which is also the state capital, and the headquarters location for the forest.

The forest was the site of the 1949 Mann Gulch fire, which claimed the lives of 13 firefighters and which was the subject of both Norman Maclean's book Young Men and Fire and James Keelaghan's folk song "Cold Missouri Waters."

In descending order of land area the forest is located in parts of Lewis and Clark, Broadwater, Powell, Jefferson, and Meagher counties. There are local ranger district offices in Helena, Lincoln, and Townsend.

See also
 List of forests in Montana
 Lewis and Clark Pass (Montana)

References

External links 
 
 

 
National Forests of Montana
National Forests of the Rocky Mountains
Protected areas established in 1906
Protected areas of Lewis and Clark County, Montana
Protected areas of Broadwater County, Montana
Protected areas of Powell County, Montana
Protected areas of Jefferson County, Montana
Protected areas of Meagher County, Montana
1906 establishments in Montana